Richard Francis Chiles (born November 22, 1949, in Sacramento, California, and raised in Winters, California) is a former outfielder in Major League Baseball.

Chiles was drafted by the Houston Astros in the second round of the 1968 Major League Baseball Draft out of Winters High School (California) and he played six seasons in the major leagues between 1971 and 1978. He batted .254 (157/618) with 68 runs, 6 home runs and 76 RBIs.

He was traded with Buddy Harris from the Astros to the New York Mets for Tommie Agee at the Winter Meetings on November 27, 1972.

He currently resides in Yolo County, in Northern California.

Chiles is a cousin of Baseball Hall of Fame member George "Highpockets" Kelly.

References

External links
, or Retrosheet, or Pura Pelota (Venezuelan Winter League)

Baseball players from Sacramento, California
Major League Baseball left fielders
1949 births
Living people
People from Winters, California
Covington Astros players
Florida Instructional League Astros players
Hawaii Islanders players
Houston Astros players
Memphis Blues players
Minnesota Twins players
Navegantes del Magallanes players
American expatriate baseball players in Venezuela
New York Mets players
Oklahoma City 89ers players
Peninsula Astros players
Portland Beavers players
Tacoma Tugs players
Tucson Toros players